"You Can Cry" is a song by American music producer Marshmello and American rapper Juicy J, featuring guest vocals from British singer James Arthur. Written and produced by Marshmello, with additional writing from Juicy J, Charlie Puth and Christian Rich, it was released by Joytime Collective and Columbia Records on May 4, 2018.

Release and composition
On April 29, 2018, Marshmello announced the song on social media with a short snippet. Arthur previously wrote in a tweet about how excited he was to be recording vocals for the track. "You Can Cry" is a hip hop ballad that features "a slow, sentimental beat" and a falsetto chorus performed by Arthur. Lyrically, the song is about having a partner who shows love and care. Juicy J also interpolates "Big Fish" by Vince Staples in the song.

Critical reception
Peter A. Berry of XXL wrote of the song: "With this eclectic blend of artists comes a unique sound, and we mean that in the best way imaginable." He opined that "Juicy's flow rings through loud and clear, even as Arthur's smooth vocals melt into the energetic instrumental", capturing both of the artists' dynamic talents. Your EDM's Matthew Meadow noted the song's lack of a drop and "the Marshmello sound", whilst praising Arthur's falsetto chorus and Juicy J's smooth and reserved style.

Track listing

Personnel
Credits adapted from Tidal.
 Marshmello – production, mix engineering, master engineering
 Juicy J – vocals
 James Arthur – vocals
 Michael "Crazy Mike" Foster – record engineering

Charts

Certifications

Release history

References

External links
 

2010s ballads
2018 singles
2018 songs
Columbia Records singles
Marshmello songs
Juicy J songs
James Arthur songs
Songs written by Marshmello
Songs written by Juicy J
Songs written by Charlie Puth
Songs written by Kehinde Hassan
Songs written by Taiwo Hassan